Andriy Mykolayovych Nesmachnyi (born 28 February 1979) is a retired Russian-born Ukrainian footballer. He has spent his entire career at Dynamo Kyiv in the Ukrainian Premier League. He was a skillful, attacking left-back who could also play as central defender and left midfielder. Nesmachniy also played for the Ukraine national football team and is the most capped foreign-born player for Ukraine with 67 matches.

Club career
Andriy Mykolayovych Nesmachniy was born on 28 February 1979 in Bryansk, Soviet Union. He started as a graduate of the Tavriya Simferopol school. He then joined Dynamo Kyiv for the 1997–98 season. He was originally intended for the main team, but spent the next two seasons at the reserve team Dynamo-2 Kyiv. Beginning in the 2000–01 season, Nesmachniy appeared much more often on the main team, where he has stayed until 2011. Nesmachniy retired in 2011 to concentrate on his religious beliefs as he became one of Jehovah's Witnesses.

Nesmachniy almost joined Blackburn Rovers of the English Premier League during the January 2007 transfer window. Manager Mark Hughes had confirmed his interest saying that he had "good football intelligence" and "a great international experience". He also confirmed that the defender was training with the squad in late December 2006. However, he did not make a promise that a move was going to be a possibility. Nesmachniy in the end, did not join Blackburn.

International career
Nesmachnyi was first called up to the Ukraine national football team in 2000. Since then he has been capped 63 times. His career was highlighted in 2006, when Ukraine made it to their first ever FIFA World Cup. Ukraine made it to the quarterfinals, getting out to eventual champions Italy.

During the World Cup in Germany, Nesmachnyi noticeably did not sing the Ukraine national anthem and place his hand on his heart. When asked about this in an interview, Nesmachnyi announced that "My parents and I are Jehovah's Witnesses for a long time. Our Bible-based beliefs does not allow us to idolize anyone and anything, such as a flag and an anthem, and to put my hand on my heart. All glory and praise belongs to God, Jehovah."

On 17 March, Nesmachnyi announced that he personally decided to retire from the Ukraine national football team, and that he continues to have good relations with head coach Oleksiy Mykhailychenko. He explained his decision by saying that he wants to concentrate on his club career in Dynamo as well as on his spiritual and family life. Upon retiring, Nesmachniy has played 67 games for Ukraine, the first being against Bulgaria on 26 April 2000, and the last being on 10 February 2009 against Slovakia.

Career statistics

Club

Honours
Dynamo-2 Kyiv
 Ukrainian First League (2): 1998–99, 1999–2000

Dynamo Kyiv
 Ukrainian Premier League (7): 1997–98, 1999–2000, 2000–01, 2002–03, 2003–04, 2006–07, 2008–09
 Ukrainian Cup (5): 1999–2000, 2002–2003, 2004–05, 2005–06, 2006–07
Ukrainian Super Cup (1): 2004

References

 Profile on website Football Ukraine

External links
 
 

1979 births
2006 FIFA World Cup players
FC Dynamo Kyiv players
FC Dynamo-2 Kyiv players
FC Dynamo-3 Kyiv players
Living people
Sportspeople from Bryansk
Ukraine international footballers
Ukrainian footballers
Ukrainian Jehovah's Witnesses
Russian emigrants to Ukraine
Ukrainian Premier League players
Ukrainian First League players
Ukrainian Second League players
Ukrainian Amateur Football Championship players
Association football fullbacks